Condal Club de Fútbol is a football team based in Noreña in the autonomous community of Asturias. Founded in 1940, the team plays in Tercera División Group 2.

History 
The club was founded in 1940 as Club Condal. It played during three seasons in Tercera División before disappearing in 1964.

In 1968, the club was re-founded as Condal Club, and played in Regional divisions until 2001, when it promoted to Tercera División. Condal won its first Tercera División championship in the 2014–15 season, and qualified for the 2015 promotion playoffs to Segunda División B.

Season to season

As Club Condal

As Condal CF

26 seasons in Tercera División

First team squad

Colours 
 Home colours: Red shirt, blue shorts and red socks.
 Away colours: Blue shirt, blue shorts and blue socks.

Stadium 
The club's home ground is Alejandro Ortea, which has a capacity of 2,000 spectators.

Women's team
Condal created a women's football team in 2017. It started competing in the Regional league.

Season by season

References

External links 
Official website 
Futbolenasturias.com profile 
Futbolme team profile 

Football clubs in Asturias
Association football clubs established in 1940
1940 establishments in Spain